RRF may refer to:

 Raptor Research Foundation, US based ornithological organization
 Ready Reserve Force, A fleet of reserve ships to be used by the Military Sealift Command when activated
 Rapid reaction force, a military or police emergency unit
 Royal Regiment of Fusiliers, an infantry regiment of the British Army
 Detroit Reentry Center, formerly Ryan Correctional Facility (code RRF)
 Reed Reactor Facility, a nuclear reactor
 Ribosome Recycling Factor, in protein synthesis
 Risk reduction factor
 Ross River fever, a mosquito-borne illness
 Relentless Reckless Forever, seventh studio album of Finnish metal band Children of Bodom